Wang Wei (born 25 December 1978 in Beijing, China) is a baseball catcher from the People's Republic of China. He holds the distinction of having hit the first home run ever in the World Baseball Classic, when China played eventual champion Japan in the first round.  On June 20, 2007, he signed a minor league contract with the Seattle Mariners of Major League Baseball.

While playing for China in the 2008 Summer Olympics, Wang injured his knee in a collision with USA player Matt LaPorta. He had to have surgery on it and will miss into the 2009 season.

External links

Mariners sign Wei

1978 births
2006 World Baseball Classic players
2013 World Baseball Classic players
2017 World Baseball Classic players
Baseball players at the 1998 Asian Games
Baseball players at the 2006 Asian Games
Baseball players at the 2008 Summer Olympics
Baseball players at the 2010 Asian Games
Baseball players at the 2014 Asian Games
Baseball players from Beijing
Beijing Tigers players
Chinese baseball players
Living people
Olympic baseball players of China
Chinese expatriate baseball players in the United States
Asian Games competitors for China